Alphonse Martin (born 18 April 1930) is a Belgian water polo player. He competed at the 1948 Summer Olympics and the 1952 Summer Olympics.

References

External links
 

1930 births
Possibly living people
Belgian male water polo players
Olympic water polo players of Belgium
Water polo players at the 1948 Summer Olympics
Water polo players at the 1952 Summer Olympics
Sportspeople from Antwerp
20th-century Belgian people